The Kolkata Metro is a Mass Rapid Transit Urban Railway network in Kolkata, India.  It was the first underground railway to be built in India, with the first operations commencing in October, 1984 and the full stretch that was initially planned being operational by February, 1995. , there are 40 metro stations in the network.

Currently, there are three lines, the North-South Corridor (with 26 stations), East-West Corridor (with 8 stations) and Joka-Esplanade Corridor (with 6 stations). In the future, there will be three other metro lines.

Operational stations

Stations planned, proposed or under-construction

See also
List of Kolkata Metro depots and yards
List of Delhi Metro stations
List of Kochi Metro stations
List of Jaipur Metro stations
List of Chennai Metro stations
List of Namma Metro stations
List of Mumbai Metro stations

References

External links

 Official Website for line 1
 Official Website for line 2

Kolkata
Kolkata
 
Kolkata metro stations
Kolkata Metro